Hang Mei Tsuen is an MTR Light Rail stop. It is located at ground level at Ping Ha Road near Hang Mei Tsuen in Ping Shan, Yuen Long District. It began service on 10 January 1993 and belongs to Zone 4.

The station, named after the nearby rural village of Hang Mei Tsuen, is utilised by some passengers as an interchange between routes 751 and 761P.

History
The station opened on 10 January 1993 as part of the 2.7-km Tin Shui Wai Extension project, built by KCR to serve the developing Tin Shui Wai New Town. It was initially served by Route 721 from Tin Shui Wai to Yuen Long. Two months later, on 27 March 1993, an additional service (route 722) commenced between Tin Shui Wai and Siu Hong stop.

Route 722 (to Siu Hong) was replaced with route 720 (to Yau Oi), which in turn was replaced with route 751 in December 2003. At the same time, Route 721 was replaced with route 761. The December 2003 changes were made due to the commissioning of the West Rail project.

There was an accident at this station on 20 December 2016. Two light rail trains collided, injuring 19.

Physical description
Hang Mei Tsuen stop has two covered, open-air side platforms, each long enough to accommodate a two-car train. The shelters cover the full length of both platforms.

The platforms can be entered from both their north and south ends. The northern ends of both platforms are accessible by ramps, whereas stairs are provided at the southern ends. There are pedestrian level crossings at either end of the station.

See also
 Ping Shan Tin Shui Wai Public Library – located to the north

References

1993 establishments in Hong Kong
MTR Light Rail stops
Former Kowloon–Canton Railway stations
Ping Shan
Railway stations in Hong Kong opened in 1993
MTR Light Rail stops named from housing estates